The red deer (Cervus elaphus) is one of the largest deer species. A male red deer is called a stag or hart, and a female is called a hind. The red deer inhabits most of Europe, the Caucasus Mountains region, Anatolia, Iran, and parts of western Asia. It also inhabits the Atlas Mountains of Northern Africa; its early ancestors are thought to have crossed over to Morocco, then to Algeria, Libya and Tunisia via the Strait of Gibraltar, becoming the only species of true deer (Cervidae) to inhabit Africa. Red deer have been introduced to other areas, including Australia, New Zealand, the United States, Canada, Peru, Uruguay, Chile and Argentina. In many parts of the world, the meat (venison) from red deer is used as a food source.

Red deer are ruminants, characterized by a four-chambered stomach. Genetic evidence indicates that the red deer, as traditionally defined, is a species group, rather than a single species, though exactly how many species the group includes remains disputed. The closely related and slightly larger American elk, or wapiti, native to North America and northeastern Asia, had been regarded as a subspecies of red deer, but recently it has been established as a distinct species. The ancestor of all red deer (and wapiti) probably originated in central Asia and resembled sika deer. Additional genetic research has suggested that the closest living species to the red deer is the European fallow deer, Dama dama.

Although at one time red deer were rare in parts of Europe, they were never close to extinction. Reintroduction and conservation efforts, such as in the United Kingdom and Portugal, have resulted in an increase of red deer populations, while other areas, such as North Africa, have continued to show a population decline.

Description

The red deer is the fourth-largest extant deer species, behind the moose, elk, and sambar deer. It is a ruminant, eating its food in two stages and having an even number of toes on each hoof, like camels, goats, and cattle. European red deer have a relatively long tail compared to their Asian and North American relatives. Subtle differences in appearance are noted between the various subspecies of red deer, primarily in size and antlers, with the smallest being the Corsican red deer found on the islands of Corsica and Sardinia and the largest being the Caspian red deer (or maral) of Asia Minor and the Caucasus Region to the west of the Caspian Sea.

The deer of central and western Europe vary greatly in size, with some of the largest deer found in the Carpathian Mountains in Central Europe. Western European red deer, historically, grew to large size given ample food supply (including people's crops), and descendants of introduced populations living in New Zealand and Argentina have grown quite large in both body and antler size. Large red deer stags, like the Caspian red deer or those of the Carpathian Mountains, may rival North American elk in size. Female red deer are much smaller than their male counterparts.

Size
Based on body mass, they are likely the fourth largest extant deer species on average, behind the moose, the elk and the sambar deer.

Neck mane
The males of many subspecies also grow a short neck mane during the autumn. The male deer of the British Isles and Norway tend to have the thickest and most noticeable manes. Male Caspian red deer (C. e. maral) and Spanish red deer (C. e. hispanicus) do not carry neck manes. Male deer of all subspecies, however, tend to have stronger and thicker neck muscles than female deer, which may give them an appearance of having neck manes. Red deer hinds (females) do not have neck manes.

Antlers
Only the stags have antlers, which start growing in the spring and are shed each year, usually at the end of winter. Antlers, which are made of bone, can grow at a rate of  a day. While an antler is growing, it is covered with highly vascular skin called velvet, which supplies oxygen and nutrients to the growing bone.

The antlers are testosterone-driven and as the stag's testosterone levels drop in the autumn, the velvet is shed and the antlers stop growing. With the approach of autumn, the antlers begin to calcify and the stags' testosterone production builds for the approaching rut (mating season).

European red deer antlers are distinctive in being rather straight and rugose, with the fourth and fifth tines forming a "crown" or "cup" in larger males. Any tines in excess of the fourth and fifth tines grow radially from the cup, which are generally absent in the antlers of smaller red deer, such as Corsican red deer. Western European red deer antlers feature "bez" (second) tines that are either absent or smaller than the brow tines. However, bez tines occur frequently in Norwegian red deer. Antlers of Caspian red deer carry large bez tines and form less-developed cups than western European red deer, their antlers are thus more like the "throw back" top tines of the North American elk (C. canadensis), known as maraloid characteristics. A stag can (exceptionally) have antlers with no tines, and is then known as a switch. Similarly, a stag that does not grow antlers is a hummel.

Coat
European red deer tend to be reddish-brown in their summer coats, and some individuals may have a few spots on the backs of their summer coats. During the autumn, all red deer subspecies grow thicker coats of hair, which helps to insulate them during the winter. Autumn is also when some of the stags grow their neck manes. The autumn/winter coats of most subspecies are most distinct. The Caspian red deer's winter coat is greyer and has a larger and more distinguished light rump-patch (like wapiti and some central Asian red deer) compared to the Western European red deer, which has more of a greyish-brown coat with a darker yellowish rump patch in the winter.

By the time summer begins, the heavy winter coat has been shed; the animals are known to rub against trees and other objects to help remove hair from their bodies. Red deer have different colouration based on the seasons and types of habitats, with grey or lighter colouration prevalent in the winter and more reddish and darker coat colouration in the summer.

Distribution

The Cervus genus ancestors of red deer first appear in fossil records 12 million years ago during the Miocene in Eurasia.

Europe and North Africa
The European red deer is found in southwestern Asia (Asia Minor and Caucasus regions), North Africa, and Europe. The red deer is the largest nondomesticated land mammal still existing in Ireland. The Barbary stag (which resembles the western European red deer) is the only member of the deer family represented in Africa, with the population centred in the northwestern region of the continent in the Atlas Mountains. As of the mid-1990s, Morocco, Tunisia, and Algeria were the only African countries known to have red deer.

In the Netherlands, a large herd (about 3000 animals counted in late 2012) lives in the Oostvaardersplassen, a nature reserve. Ireland has its own unique subspecies. In France, the population is thriving, having multiplied five-fold in the last half-century, increasing from 30,000 in 1970 to around 160,000 in 2014. The deer has particularly expanded its footprint into forests at higher altitudes than before.
In the UK, indigenous populations occur in Scotland, the Lake District, and the south west of England (principally on Exmoor). Not all of these are of entirely pure bloodlines, as some of these populations have been supplemented with deliberate releases of deer from parks, such as Warnham or Woburn Abbey, in an attempt to increase antler sizes and body weights. The University of Edinburgh found that, in Scotland, extensive hybridisation with the closely related sika deer has occurred.

Several other populations have originated either with "carted" deer kept for stag hunts being left out at the end of the hunt, escapes from deer farms, or deliberate releases. Carted deer were kept by stag hunts with no wild red deer in the locality and were normally recaptured after the hunt and used again; although the hunts are called "stag hunts", the Norwich Staghounds only hunted hinds (female red deer), and in 1950, at least eight hinds (some of which may have been pregnant) were known to be at large near Kimberley and West Harling; they formed the basis of a new population based in Thetford Forest in Norfolk. Further substantial red deer herds originated from escapes or deliberate releases in the New Forest, the Peak District, Suffolk, Lancashire, Brecon Beacons, and North Yorkshire, as well as many other smaller populations scattered throughout England and Wales, and they are all generally increasing in numbers and range. A census of deer populations in 2007 and again in 2011 coordinated by the British Deer Society records the red deer as having continued to expand their range in England and Wales since 2000, with expansion most notable in the Midlands and East Anglia.

Iran 
Caspian red deer are found in the Hyrcanian Forests.

New Zealand

In New Zealand, red deer were introduced by acclimatisation societies along with other deer and game species. The first red deer to reach New Zealand were a pair sent by Lord Petre in 1851 from his herd at Thorndon Park, Essex, to the South Island, but the hind was shot before they had a chance to breed. Lord Petre sent another stag and two hinds in 1861, and these were liberated near Nelson, from where they quickly spread. The first deer to reach the North Island were a gift to Sir Frederick Weld from Windsor Great Park and were released near Wellington; these were followed by further releases up to 1914. Between 1851 and 1926, 220 separate liberations of red deer involved over 800 deer. In 1927, the State Forest Service introduced a bounty for red deer shot on their land, and in 1931, government control operations were commenced. Between 1931 and March 1975, 1,124,297 deer were killed on official operations.

The introduced red deer have adapted well and are widely hunted on both islands; many of the 220 introductions used deer originating from Scotland (Invermark) or one of the major deer parks in England, principally Warnham, Woburn Abbey or Windsor Great Park. Some hybridisation happened with the closely related American elk (Cervus canadensis nelsoni) introduced in Fiordland in 1921. New Zealand red deer produce very large antlers and are regarded as amongst the best in the world by hunters. Along with the other introduced deer species, they are, however, officially regarded as a noxious pest and are still heavily culled using professional hunters working with helicopters, or even poisoned.

Australia 
The first red deer to reach Australia were probably the six that Prince Albert sent in 1860 from Windsor Great Park to Thomas Chirnside, who was starting a herd at Werribee Park, south west of Melbourne in Victoria. Further introductions were made in New South Wales, Queensland, South Australia, and Western Australia. Today, red deer in Australia range from Queensland south through New South Wales into Victoria and across to South Australia, with the numbers increasing. The Queensland, Victorian and most New South Wales strains can still be traced to the early releases, but South Australia's population, along with all others, is now largely recent farm escapees. This is having adverse effects on the integrity of wild herds, as now more and larger herds are being grown due to the superior genetics that have been attained by selective breeding.

Wild red deer are a feral pest species in Australia, do considerable harm to the natural environment, and are a significant road traffic hazard.

Argentina and Chile 
In Argentina and Chile, the red deer has had a potentially adverse impact on native animal species, such as the South Andean deer or huemul; the International Union for Conservation of Nature and Natural Resources has labelled the animal as one of the world's 100 worst invaders.

Migration
Red deer in Europe generally spend their winters at lower altitudes in more wooded terrain. During the summer, they migrate to higher elevations where food supplies are greater and better for the calving season.

Taxonomy and evolution
Until recently, biologists considered the red deer and elk or wapiti (C. canadensis) the same species, forming a continuous distribution throughout temperate Eurasia and North America. This belief was based largely on the fully fertile hybrids that can be produced under captive conditions.

Genetic evidence clearly shows the wapiti and red deer form two separate species.

Another member of the red deer group which may represent a separate species is C. corsicanus. If so, C. corsicanus includes the subspecies C. e. barbarus (perhaps a synonym of C. e. corsicanus), and is restricted to Maghreb in North Africa, Corsica, and Sardinia.

The International Union for Conservation of Nature originally listed nine subspecies of red deer (Cervus elaphus): three as endangered, one as vulnerable, one as near threatened, and four without enough data to give a category (Data Deficient). The species as a whole, however, is listed as least concern. However, this was based on the traditional classification of red deer as one species (Cervus elaphus), including the wapiti. The common red deer is also known as simply red deer.

Selected members of the red deer species group are listed in the table below. Of the ones listed, C. e. hippelaphus and C. e. scoticus may be junior synonyms.

Cervus elaphus appeared in Europe by the beginning of the Middle Pleistocene around 800,000 years ago. These earliest forms belonged to the palaeosubspecies Cervus elaphus acoronatus. Other palaeosubspecies are known, including those belonging to C. elaphus rianensis from the Middle Pleistocene of Italy, C. elaphus siciliae from the late Middle and Late Pleistocene of Sicily.

Behaviour

Mature red deer (C. elaphus) usually stay in single-sex groups for most of the year. During the mating season, called the rut, mature stags compete for the attentions of the hinds and will then try to defend the hinds they attract. Rival stags challenge opponents by belling and walking in parallel. This allows combatants to assess each other's antlers, body size and fighting prowess. If neither stag backs down, a clash of antlers can occur, and stags sometimes sustain serious injuries. Red deer are among the mammals exhibiting homosexual behavior.

Dominant stags follow groups of hinds during the rut, from August into early winter. The stags may have as many as 20 hinds to keep from other, less attractive males. Only mature stags hold harems (groups of hinds), and breeding success peaks at about eight years of age. Stags two to four years old rarely hold harems and spend most of the rut on the periphery of larger harems, as do stags over 11 years old. Young and old stags that do acquire a harem hold it later in the breeding season than those stags in their prime. Harem-holding stags rarely feed and lose up to 20% of their body weight. Stags that enter the rut in poor condition are less likely to make it through to the peak conception period.

Male European red deer have a distinctive roar during the rut, which is an adaptation to forested environments, in contrast to male American elk stags which "bugle" during the rut in adaptation to open environments. The male deer roars to keep his harem of females together. The females are initially attracted to those males that both roar most often and have the loudest roar call. Males also use the roar call when competing with other males for females during the rut, and along with other forms of posturing and antler fights, is a method used by the males to establish dominance. Roaring is most common during the early dawn and late evening, which is also when the crepuscular deer are most active in general.

Breeding, gestation and lifespan

Female red deer reach sexual maturity at 2 years of age. Red deer mating patterns usually involve a dozen or more mating attempts before the first successful one. There may be several more matings before the stag will seek out another mate in his harem. Females in their second autumn can produce one or very rarely two offspring per year. After two weeks, calves are able to join the herd and are fully weaned after two months. The offspring will remain with their mothers for almost one full year, leaving around the time the next season's offspring are produced. The gestation period is the same for all subspecies.

All red deer calves are born spotted, as is common with many deer species, and lose their spots by the end of summer. However, as in many species of Old World deer, some adults do retain a few spots on the backs of their summer coats.

Red deer live over 20 years in captivity and in the wild they live 10 to 13 years, though some subspecies with less predation pressure average 15 years.

Protection from predators

Male red deer retain their antlers for more than half the year, and are less gregarious and less likely to group with other males when they have antlers. The antlers provide self-defence, as does a strong front-leg kicking action performed by both sexes when attacked. Once the antlers are shed, stags tend to form bachelor groups which allow them to cooperatively work together. Herds tend to have one or more members watching for potential danger, while the remaining members eat and rest.

After the rut, females form large herds of up to 50 individuals. The newborn calves are kept close to the hinds by a series of vocalizations between the two, and larger nurseries have an ongoing and constant chatter during the daytime hours. When approached by predators, the largest and most robust females may make a stand, using their front legs to kick at their attackers. Guttural grunts and posturing is used with all but the most determined of predators with great effectiveness. Aside from humans and domestic dogs, the grey wolf is probably the most dangerous predator European red deer encounter. Occasionally, the brown bear will prey on European red deer.

Red deer in folklore and art

Red deer are widely depicted in cave art found throughout European caves, with some of the artwork dating from as early as 40,000 years ago, during the Upper Paleolithic. Siberian cave art from the Neolithic of 7,000 years ago has abundant depictions of red deer, including what can be described as spiritual artwork, indicating the importance of this mammal to the peoples of that region (Note: these animals were most likely wapiti (C. canadensis) in Siberia, not red deer).
Red deer are also often depicted on Pictish stones (circa 550–850 AD), from the early medieval period in Scotland, usually as prey animals for human or animal predators. In medieval hunting, the red deer was the most prestigious quarry, especially the mature stag, which in England was called a hart.

Red deer products
Red deer are held in captivity for a variety of reasons. The meat of the deer, called venison, was until recently restricted in the United Kingdom to those with connections to the aristocratic or poaching communities, and a licence was needed to sell it legally, but it is now widely available in supermarkets, especially in the autumn. The Queen followed the custom of offering large pieces of venison to members of the Cabinet of the United Kingdom and others. Some estates in the Scottish Highlands still sell deer-stalking accompanied by a gillie in the traditional way, on unfenced land, while others operate more like farms for venison. Venison is widely considered to be both flavourful and nutritious. It is higher in protein and lower in fat than either beef or chicken.

The red deer can produce  of antler velvet annually. On ranches in New Zealand, China, Siberia, and elsewhere, this velvet is collected and sold to markets in East Asia, where it is used for holistic medicines, with South Korea being the primary consumer. In Russia, a medication produced from antler velvet is sold under the brand name Pantokrin.
The antlers themselves are also believed by East Asians to have medicinal purposes and are often ground up and used in small quantities.

Historically, related deer species such as Central Asian red deer, wapiti, Thorold's deer, and sika deer have been reared on deer farms in Central and Eastern Asia by Han Chinese, Turkic peoples, Tungusic peoples, Mongolians, and Koreans. In modern times, western countries such as New Zealand and United States have taken to farming European red deer for similar purposes.

Deer hair products are also used in the fly fishing industry, being used to tie flies.

Deer antlers are also used for decorative purposes and have been used for artwork, furniture and other novelty items. Deer antlers were and still are the source material for horn furniture. Already in the 15th century trophies of case were used for clothes hook, storage racks and chandeliers, the so-called Lusterweibchen. In the 19th century the European nobility discovered red deer antlers as perfect decorations for their manors and hunting castles. This fashion trend splashes over to upper- and middle-class households in the mid of the 19th century.

In recent times deer antler home decors can be found in home styling magazines.

Gallery

See also
Deer of Great Britain
Deer farm
Medieval deer park
Venison

References

Further reading
Cameron, Donald; Fortescue, Hugh Fortescue 3rd, earl; Shand, Alexander Innes (1896) Red Deer: Natural history, London, New York [etc.] : Longmans, Green and co.
Clarke, J. (1866), The naturalist: A treatise on the growth of the horns of the red deer, Barnstaple, A.P. Wood
Heptner, V. G.; Nasimovich, A. A.; Bannikov, A. G.; Hoffman, R. S. (1988) Mammals of the Soviet Union, Volume I, Washington, D.C. : Smithsonian Institution Libraries and National Science Foundation
Jeffries, Richard (1884), Red Deer, London Longmans, Green#B.

External links

Natural History of Red Deer (Wildlife Online)
World of Deer Museum New Zealand
New Zealand Red Stag Hunting Information
red deer antler furnishings

red deer
red deer
Mammals of Europe
Mammals of North Africa
Mammals of Western Asia
National symbols of Ireland
red deer
red deer